Arphia granulata is a species of grasshopper in the subfamily Oedipodinae ("band-winged grasshoppers"), in the family Acrididae ("short-horned grasshoppers"). The species is known generally as the "southern yellow-winged grasshopper".
It is found in North America.

References

Further reading
 Capinera J.L, Scott R.D., Walker T.J. (2004). Field Guide to Grasshoppers, Katydids, and Crickets of the United States. Cornell University Press.
 Otte, Daniel (1995). "Grasshoppers [Acridomorpha] D". Orthoptera Species File 5, 630.
 Ross H. Arnett. (2000). American Insects: A Handbook of the Insects of America North of Mexico. CRC Press.

Oedipodinae
Insects described in 1884